BAP Angamos (SS-31) is one of two Type 209/1200 submarines ordered by the Peruvian Navy on August 12, 1976. She was built by the German shipbuilder Howaldtswerke Deutsche Werft AG at its shipyard in Kiel. She was originally named Casma after a battle which took place between naval forces of Peru and Chile on January 12, 1839. Following sea trials in the North Sea, she arrived to its homeport of Callao in 1981. After a major overhaul by Servicio Industrial de la Marina at Callao SIMA in 1998, she was renamed Angamos after the battle of the same name which took place on October 8, 1879.

Sources
Baker III, Arthur D., The Naval Institute Guide to Combat Fleets of the World 2002-2003. Naval Institute Press, 2002.
Ortiz Sotelo, Jorge, Apuntes para la historia de los submarinos peruanos. Biblioteca Nacional, 2001.

1979 ships
Type 209 submarines of the Peruvian Navy
Ships built in Kiel